The 1999 Exide NASCAR Select Batteries 400 was a NASCAR Winston Cup Series race held on September 11, 1999, at Richmond International Raceway in Richmond, Virginia. Contested over 400 laps on the three–quarter (1.2 km) short track, it was the 25th race of the 1999 NASCAR Winston Cup Series season. Tony Stewart of Joe Gibbs Racing won the race, earning his first career Winston Cup Series win. Bobby Labonte finished second and Dale Jarrett finished third.

Background
In 1953, Richmond International Raceway began hosting the Grand National Series with Lee Petty winning that first race in Richmond.  The original track was paved in 1968.  In 1988, the track was re-designed into its present D-shaped configuration

The name for the raceway complex was "Strawberry Hill" until the Virginia State Fairgrounds site was bought out in 1999 and renamed the "Richmond International Raceway".

Entry list

Qualifying

Race recap

Race results

Race Statistics
 Time of race: 2:53:04
 Average Speed: 
 Pole Speed: 
 Cautions: 6 for 45 laps
 Margin of Victory: 1.115 sec
 Lead changes: 13
 Percent of race run under caution: 11.2%         
 Average green flag run: 50.7 laps

References

Exide NASCAR Select Batteries 400
Exide NASCAR Select Batteries 400
NASCAR races at Richmond Raceway